Salvia omeiana is a perennial plant that is native to forest edges and hillsides in Sichuan province in China, growing at  elevation. Inflorescences are raceme-panicles, with a  yellow corolla.

There are two varieties: Salvia omeiana var. omeiana has an ovate shaped bract, and no hairs inside the corolla tube. Salvia omeiana var. grandibracteata has a more lanceolate bract, and is slightly hairy inside the corolla tube.

References

omeiana
Flora of China